The International Language Review (A Clearing House for Facts, Theories and Fancies on the History, Science and Bibliography of International Language Movement, ILR) was a magazine which was intended as a forum for proponents of the various international language projects to discuss and develop their ideas, started in 1955 by Floyd and Evelyn Hardin from Denver, Colorado, and published in 50 issues until 1968 (some other sources state the year to be 1966).

Floyd Hardin, together with Arturo Alfandari, helped found Friends of Neo, an organization for the promotion of the constructed language Neo.

References

Defunct magazines published in the United States
English-language magazines
Magazines established in 1955
Magazines disestablished in 1968
Magazines published in Colorado
Mass media in Denver
1955 establishments in Colorado